James Nagbe Nagbe served as the 14th Chief Justice of Liberia from 1986 until his resignation in 1987.

Nagbe represented Montserrado County during the 1983 Constitutional Convention to draft a new constitution for the country due to the previous constitution's suspension after the 1980 coup d'état. On 16 January 1986, the newly elected President Samuel Doe nominated Nagbe to become the Chief Justice of Liberia, replacing the transitional Chief Justice, Emmanuel Gbalazeh. However, Nagbe was unconstitutionally forced to resign by Doe on 18 June 1987, along with the entire Supreme Court bench.

References

Chief justices of Liberia
Living people
People from Montserrado County
Year of birth missing (living people)
Place of birth missing (living people)
20th-century Liberian judges